Together, officially known as the Social Movement for Peace and Stable Development of Estonia is a pro-Russia political movement in Estonia. It ran with the Estonian United Left Party for the 2023 parliamentary election. The movement is led by chiropractor Aivo Peterson (born Krõlov) and crypto businessman Oleg Ivanov.

History 
The non-profit association Koos Rahu Eest in Eesti is registered with the movement.

On 24 April 2022, Ivanov posted a video where he called the Bucha massacre staged. He also urged the "Baltic regimes", which can organize a similar murder in the Baltic countries, to shoot "dissidents". "Estonia is destined to be destroyed in the war with Russia. The allies are fighting Russia with the hands of their vassal states, and not directly. According to the plans of the allies, Estonia will be destroyed. Everything is being done so that the Baltic states become the next hotbed of war. The same criminals who brought the masses to syringes are now pushing countries to go to war with Russia."

In November 2022, Ivanov participated in the program of the well-known Russian propagandist Vladimir Solovyov, where he said that Estonia should be open to negotiations, but the current orientation towards "escalation" does not bode well: "Our main message is peace and inter-ethnic harmony in Estonia."

Danish Radio (DR) quoted Ivanov "I know that Putin launched a military operation. But I also know that if Putin had not done it, the Ukrainian army would have attacked Donbass within days".

On 30 November 2022, the registry department of the Tartu County Court did not register the movement as a political party, as the total number of its members was below the required minimum – at least 500 members. Therefore, the movement decided to participate in the 2023 elections as part of the Estonian United Left Party.

Political programme 
The election program of the movement envisages the neutrality of the Republic of Estonia and non-membership of military alliances (i.e. Estonia outside of NATO), as well as granting Estonian citizenship to all people who lived here in 1991 and abolishing the institution of non-citizens (the so-called "gray passport"). The election program also includes "preservation and protection of traditional values, family, religion, cultural and historical heritage. Also present is a ban on rewriting history and destroying monuments, and a requirement that defense spending not exceed 1% of the gross domestic product."

References 

Political movements in Estonia
2022 establishments in Estonia